Loose is the third studio album by American singer/songwriter Victoria Williams, released in 1994.

Her previous album, 1990’s Swing the Statue!, won some critical praise but completely failed to attract commercial attention, and the collapse of Rough Trade Records left her without a contract until Mammoth Records bought the rights to that album. Two years afterwards, Williams was diagnosed with multiple sclerosis and as a working musician, lacked health insurance or the money to pay her medical fees; however, a large number of musicians who admired the talent she had shown on her Geffen Records albums came in to support her with 1993’s Sweet Relief: A Benefit for Victoria Williams tribute album recording her songs – including two unrecorded by Williams herself.

Loose, in contrast to her first two albums, was recorded with a large crew including some high-profile contributors like R.E.M.’s Mike Mills, Sly Stone’s sister and bandmate Rose, husband-to-be Mark Olson and Soul Asylum’s Dave Pirner.

Containing a full hour of music, Loose saw Victoria Williams use a greater diversity of styles, notably the spiritual-influenced “You R Loved” and “Get Away”. Despite widespread critical praise, Loose could not break her commercially, failing to dent the Billboard Top 200, and Williams moved with new husband Olson to Joshua Tree, California.

Track listing

Personnel
 Scott Babcock – timpani, shaker
 Peter Buck – electric guitar, sitar
 Greg Cohen – acoustic bass, electric guitar
 Paul Fox – chimes, shaker
 The Richard Greene Fourteen – strings
 Lili Haydn – viola
 Don Heffington – drums, percussion 
 Rami Jaffee – organ
 Greg Leisz – electric guitar, pedal steel guitar, mandolin, acoustic guitar, dulcimer
 Gary Louris – backing vocals
 Jean McClain – backing vocals
 Mike Mills – backing vocals
 Mark Olson – vocals, acoustic guitar
 Van Dyke Parks – accordion, arrangements
 Dave Pirner – vocals
 Tim Ray – piano, electric piano
 Tammy Rogers – violin, viola, backing vocals
 Rose Stone – backing vocals
 Geri Stuyak – cello
 Tower of Power Horn Section – horns
 Doug Weisselman – clarinet, bass harmonica, clay flute
 Andrew Williams – acoustic guitar, piano, organ, backing vocals
 David Williams – backing vocals
 Victoria Williams – vocals, electric guitar, acoustic guitar, piano, dulcimer

References

1994 albums
Atlantic Records albums
Mammoth Records albums
Albums produced by Paul Fox (record producer)